Vriesea minuta is a plant species in the genus Vriesea. This species is endemic to Brazil.

References

minuta
Flora of Brazil